André De Wulf (22 December 1922 – 2 August 1990) was a Belgian bobsledder. He competed in the two-man event at the 1952 Winter Olympics.

References

External links

1922 births
1990 deaths
Belgian male bobsledders
Olympic bobsledders of Belgium
Bobsledders at the 1952 Winter Olympics
Place of birth missing